William Henry Heinemann (18 May 1863 – 5 October 1920) was an English publisher of Jewish descent and the founder of the Heinemann publishing house in London.

Early life 
On 18 May 1863, Heinemann was born in Surbiton, Surrey, England. Heinemann's father Louis Heinemann, a director of Parr's Bank and a native of Hanover, Germany. Heinemann's mother was Jane Lavino. Both his parents were Jewish by descent, although they had been Anglican for two generations. In his early life he wanted to be a musician, either as a performer or a composer, but he came to believe that he lacked the ability to be successful in that field.

Career 
Heinemann took a job with the music publishing company of Nicolas Trübner. When Trübner died in 1884, Heinemann founded his own publishing house in Covent Garden in 1890. The company published many translations of the classics in Great Britain as well as publishing such authors as H. G. Wells, Robert Louis Stevenson, Rudyard Kipling and Sylvia Plath.

Personal life 
On 2 February 1899, Heinemann married Magda Stuart Sindici, a writer who used the pseudonym Kassandra Vivaria, at St. Antonio's Church in Anzio, Italy. Her father was Augusto Sindici, an Italian poet. Her mother was Francesca Stuart Sindici, a Spanish-Italian painter. Wedding guests included James Abbott McNeill Whistler, the painter, whose book The Gentle Art of Making Enemies Heinemann had published in 1890. Whistler attended their wedding as the best man and painted the bride's portrait in 1900. In 1904, Heinemann divorced his wife.
On 5 October 1920, Heinemann died unexpectedly in London, England. Heinemann had no children and his presumptive heir, his nephew John Heinemann, had died in the First World War. Heinemann's share of the company was bought out by Frank Nelson Doubleday, the New York publisher.

He bequeathed funds to the Royal Society of Literature to establish a literary prize, the W. H. Heinemann Award, awarded from 1945 to 2003.

Scandals 
Heinemann wrongly translated the Larousse Gastronomique, replacing the mayonaise by the hollandaise as a mother-sauce. This error is still perpetuating today.

See also 
 Wolcott Balestier
 John Galsworthy
 Edmund Gosse
 Nicolas Trübner

References

Further reading
 John St John, William Heinemann: A Century of Publishing, 1890-1990, London: Heinemann, 1990.

External links

 Correspondence of James McNeill Whistler

British book publishers (people)
1863 births
1920 deaths
English people of German-Jewish descent
People from Surbiton